A bunder or bonnier is an obsolete unit of area previously used in the Low Countries (Belgium and the Netherlands).

References

Bunder at sizes.com

Units of area
Dutch words and phrases
Metricated units